Cyrus Colton MacDuffee (June 29, 1895 – August 21, 1961) from Oneida, New York was a professor of mathematics at University of Wisconsin.
He wrote a number of influential research papers in abstract algebra. MacDuffee served on the Council of the American Mathematical Society (A.M.S.), was editor of the Transactions of the A.M.S., and served as president of the Mathematical Association of America (M.A.A).

MacDuffee obtained his B.S. degree in 1917 from Colgate University and a Ph.D. in 1922 from the University of Chicago ; his thesis was on Nonassociative algebras under the direction of Leonard E. Dickson. In 1935, MacDuffee joined the University of Wisconsin, where he remained until his death in 1961. He served as chair of the department (1951–56). Later, Wisconsin endowed a university chair under his name. Prior to joining the University of Wisconsin, he served at Princeton and Ohio State. He guided 30 Ph.D. students, among them D. R. Fulkerson, H. J. Ryser, and Bonnie Stewart.

MacDuffee's daughter Helen became a statistician at Oregon State University and the mayor of Corvallis, Oregon.

Bibliography

  (2nd ed., 1946).

See also
 Latimer–MacDuffee theorem

References

1895 births
1961 deaths
20th-century American mathematicians
Algebraists
University of Chicago alumni
Colgate University alumni
University of Wisconsin–Madison faculty
Ohio State University faculty
Presidents of the Mathematical Association of America
People from Oneida, New York
Mathematicians from New York (state)